Myles Andrew Dorrian (born 26 November 1982) is an Australian rugby union player for London Irish in the Aviva Premiership. He has previously played for Bedford Blues and Coventry. Myles made his debut for Exeter against Welsh side Ospreys on 15 October 2011.

Myles position of choice is Fly-half but he can also play at Centre and Full Back

It was announced on 15 April 2013 that Myles would be joining London Irish on a two-year deal. On 16 May 2015, Dorrian returned to Bedford Blues in the RFU Championship from the 2015–16 season.

References

External links
Premiership Rugby Player Profile

1982 births
Living people
Exeter Chiefs players
Australian rugby union players
Rugby union fly-halves
Australian expatriate rugby union players
Expatriate rugby union players in England
Australian expatriate sportspeople in England